Diastictis ventralis, the white-spotted brown moth, is a moth of the family Crambidae. It is found in eastern North America.

The wingspan is about 22 mm. Adults have been recorded feeding on flower nectar of Centaurea jacea.

Subspecies
Diastictis ventralis ventralis (eastern North America)
Diastictis ventralis seamansi Munroe, 1956 (California)

References

Moths described in 1867
Spilomelinae